Leucanopsis perdita is a moth of the family Erebidae. It was described by William Schaus in 1920. It is found in Guatemala.

References

perdita
Moths described in 1920